Julian Emanuelson (born 2 June 1977) is a Surinamese-Dutch retired professional footballer. As a product of the Ajax Youth Academy, he spent most of his career playing as a midfielder for Dutch club Haarlem. He also played for Holland Sport, FC Lisse, FC Türkiyemspor in the Netherlands, and for FC Lustenau 07 in Austria.

Club career 
Born in Paramaribo, Suriname, Emanuelson immigrated to the Netherlands with his family where he progressed through the ranks of the Ajax Youth Academy. Having played for the clubs' third team Ajax Zaterdag in 1995, he was unable to break into the first team, and transferred to nearby HFC Haarlem in 1996, playing in the Eerste Divisie, the 2nd tier of professional football in the Netherlands. In 1999 Emanuelson transferred to Holland Sport from where he spent a six month loan spell in Austria playing for FC Lustenau 07. Returning to the Netherlands, he joined FC Lisse, playing in the Topklasse before joining FC Türkiyemspor in Amsterdam.

International career
He made 4 appearances for the Netherlands U-18's but never made it to the senior squad.

Personal life
Emanuelson comes from a football playing family. His father Errol Emanuelson was a professional footballer who played for S.V. Robinhood in Suriname and Sint-Niklaas in Belgium. His younger brother Urby Emanuelson, also a product of the Ajax Youth Academy, played professionally for Ajax, Milan, Fulham, Roma and Atalanta as well as the Dutch national team. While his cousin Jean-Paul Boëtius has played for Feyenoord and for the Dutch national team as well, his paternal cousin Roché Emanuelson played for the Suriname national team, having played for various clubs in the SVB Hoofdklasse.

References

1977 births
Living people
Sportspeople from Paramaribo
Dutch sportspeople of Surinamese descent
Association football midfielders
Dutch footballers
AFC Ajax players
AFC Ajax (amateurs) players
HFC Haarlem players
FC Lustenau players
FC Lisse players
FC Türkiyemspor players
Eerste Divisie players
Derde Divisie players
Dutch expatriate footballers
Expatriate footballers in Austria
Dutch expatriate sportspeople in Austria
ASV De Dijk players